The 1955 Tipperary Senior Hurling Championship was the 65th staging of the Tipperary Senior Hurling Championship since its establishment by the Tipperary County Board in 1887.

Holycross-Ballycahill were the defending champions.

On 2 October 1955, Thurles Sarsfields won the championship after a 4-10 to 0-06 defeat of Borris-Ileigh in the final at Thurles Sportsfield. It was their 18th championship title overall and their first title since 1952.

Results

Semi-finals

Final

References

Tipperary
Tipperary Senior Hurling Championship